The Witch: Part 1. The Subversion is a 2018 South Korean science fiction action horror film written and directed by Park Hoon-jung. A sequel, The Witch: Part 2. The Other One, was released on 15 June 2022.

Plot
A young girl escapes from a mysterious laboratory after a violent incident that leaves many dead. Two members that run the lab, Dr. Baek and Mr. Choi, considered her dead. The girl collapses on a farm, where she is discovered by the owner, Mr. and Mrs. Goo. His wife nurses the girl back to health and adopts her.

10 years later, the girl, named Ja-yoon, is living a normal life without any memory of her past. Her family is struggling financially, her mother is showing early signs of dementia, and Ja-yoon is suffering periodic bouts of migraines. In an effort to earn money, she decides to audition for a national singing contest that promises a large reward. She impresses the judges with her special talent - the telekinetic ability to make the microphone levitate. This makes Dr. Baek and Mr Choi realize that Ja-yoon is the girl that escaped and send men to recapture her.

On her way to Seoul for the second round of the audition, Ja-yoon is approached by a man named Nobleman, who claims to know her. After the audition, she avoids an abduction by Dr. Baek's men. A group of armed men barge into her home and hold her family at gunpoint. Entering a trance, Ja-yoon dispatches the men with superhuman strength and speed. She is left shaken, not understanding either her superhuman or psionic abilities. Nobleman demands that she accompany him or he will kill her parents. She agrees and is taken to the laboratory, where she is restrained.

Dr. Baek explains that she created Ja-yoon, genetically modifying her to have superpowers. Ja-yoon's headaches are a symptom of a disease that will kill her without proper treatment. She has her injected with a blue serum that will stop the disease for a month, leaving Ja-yoon dependent on new doses. After the injection, Ja-yoon's demeanor changes and she reveals the truth - she never lost her memory and has always known what she is. After visiting a doctor by herself, and being told that without a bone marrow transplant by a blood relative, she only has a few months left to live, she decided to track down Dr. Baek for the cure. Not knowing how to find her, she purposefully revealed her abilities during the audition to draw the attention of her creators.

With the serum restoring her to full strength, Ja-yoon escapes her bonds and kills her guards. Holding Dr. Baek at gunpoint she demands to know where the serum is produced. It is around this time that Mr. Choi comes, having heard about Ja-yoon, but she kills him with ease. She defeats Nobleman but Dr. Baek is killed during the chaos. Ja-yoon burns the building down and visits her parents, providing her father with some of the serum to give her mother to help slow the spread of her dementia. Her father alludes to always having known what Ja-yoon could do.

Three months later, Ja-yoon appears in the home of Dr. Baek's twin sister. She gives her more vials of the serum. A mysterious young woman, whose face is covered in scars, approaches Ja-yoon but Ja-yoon threatens to kill her if she touches her and the screen goes to black.

Cast
Kim Da-mi as Ja-yoon
Jo Min-su as Dr. Baek
Choi Woo-shik as Gwigongja (Nobleman)
Park Hee-soon as Mr. Choi
Go Min-si as Do Myung-hee
Choi Jung-woo as Teacher Goo
Oh Mi-hee as Teacher Goo's wife
Jung Da-eun as Ginmeori (Girl with long hair)
Kim Byeong-ok as Police Officer Do
Lee Joo Won as CEO Sung

Production
In June 2018, it was reported that Kim Da-mi, Jo Min-su, Choi Woo-shik and Park Hee-soon were starring for the film. Kim Da-mi was selected from 1,500 candidates to play the role.

Reception

Critical response

Elizabeth Kerr of The Hollywood Reporter gave a positive review and wrote, "An ever-so-delicate twist on the Korean revenge thriller. By Korean action standards The Witch: Part 1. The Subversion is lean at two hours, but in cramming so much into the narrative it stumbles over itself on more than one occasion; it very often forgets its own internal logic and drags the final showdown out to the breaking point."

Rafael Motamayor of Flickering Myth rated the film 4/5 and wrote, "Despite trying to cram too much plot, the film's atmospheric score, action sequences and visuals keep you invested in the story and what comes next."

Box office
The film opened in South Korea on June 27, 2018. During its debut weekend, the film finished in first place, ending The Accidental Detective: In Action 2-week box office reign. It sold more than 735,000 tickets from 1,117 screens from Friday to Sunday, with  gross during its opening weekend. In its second weekend, the film finished at second behind Ant-Man and the Wasp, dropping 40% from the last weekend with  gross from 451,113 tickets sold. Grossing  on its third weekend, the film finished third behind Ant-Man and the Wasp and newcomer Skyscraper. As of August 23, the film attracted 3,189,092 moviegoers, and earned .

Awards and nominations

References

External links
 
 
 
 
 The Witch: Part 1. The Subversion at Cine 21 

2018 films
South Korean action horror films
South Korean mystery films
2018 action films
2010s mystery films
Warner Bros. films
Films directed by Park Hoon-jung
2010s South Korean films